Stan is an Australian subscription video streaming service owned by Nine Entertainment Co. Initially a joint venture between Nine Entertainment Co. and Fairfax Media, Stan launched on January 26, 2015. Nine Entertainment acquired Fairfax Media in 2018, making Stan a wholly owned subsidiary of Nine Digital. Stan announced its first commissioned series, No Activity, on 1 May 2015, which later premiered on 22 October 2015.

Original programming

Drama

Comedy

Unscripted

Docuseries

Reality

Co-productions 
These shows have been commissioned by Stan with an international partner.

Continuations 
These shows have been picked up by Stan for additional seasons after having previous seasons on another network.

Specials 
These programs are one-time events related to other series.

Exclusive international distribution 
These shows have been acquired by Stan for exclusive release within Australia and are marketed as original series, unlike most exclusively distributed content which is branded under a separate "only on Stan" banner.

Original films

Feature films

Documentaries

Stand-up comedy specials 

All current feature-length specials were filmed as part of "One Night Stan", a comedy festival hosted by the streaming service.

Upcoming original programming

Drama

Comedy

Co-productions 
These shows have been commissioned by Stan with an international partner.

Upcoming original films

Feature films

Documentaries

Notes

References 

 
Stan